Paul Robson (born January 30, 1941) was a Canadian football player who played for the Winnipeg Blue Bombers. He played college football at the University of North Dakota. From 1987 to 1988, he served as general manager of the Ottawa Rough Riders. He also served as assistant general manager of the Winnipeg Blue Bombers.

In 2017, he was made a Member of the Order of Manitoba.

References

1941 births
Living people
Winnipeg Blue Bombers players
Canadian football centres
American football centers
Members of the Order of Manitoba
North Dakota Fighting Hawks football players
Players of Canadian football from Manitoba
Canadian football people from Winnipeg
Ottawa Rough Riders general managers